The following outline is provided as an overview of and topical guide to the Ottoman Empire:

The Ottoman Empire was a Muslim empire that lasted from c. 1299 to 1922. It was also known by its European contemporaries as the Turkish Empire or Turkey after the principal ethnic group. At its zenith from the sixteenth to eighteenth centuries it controlled Southeast Europe, Southwest Asia and North Africa.

General history

Main periods

 Rise of the Ottoman Empire
 Classical Age of the Ottoman Empire
 Transformation of the Ottoman Empire
 Territorial evolution of the Ottoman Empire
 Ottoman ancien régime
 Decline and modernization of the Ottoman Empire
 Defeat and dissolution of the Ottoman Empire
 Partition

Subperiods

 Ottoman Interregnum
 Sultanate of Women
 Köprülü era
 Tulip period
 Tanzimat era
 1st Constitutional Era
 2nd Constitutional Era

Historiography

 Ottoman Decline Thesis
 Ghaza thesis
 Renegade thesis
 Historiography of the fall of the Ottoman Empire

Structure of the Ottoman Empire

 Economic history of the Ottoman Empire
 State organization of the Ottoman Empire
 Social structure in the Ottoman Empire
 Culture of the Ottoman Empire
 Science and technology in the Ottoman Empire
 Ottoman Turkish language
 Demographics of the Ottoman Empire
 Religion in the Ottoman Empire
 Socioeconomics of the Ottoman enlargement era
 Millet system
 Ottoman Law
 Porte
 Tughra
 Line of succession to the Ottoman throne
 Military of the Ottoman Empire
 Enderun
 Janissary
 Sipahi
 Cebeci
 Nizam-ı Cedid Army
 Timar
 Nöker
 Ikta
 Eyalet
 Vilayets of the Ottoman Empire
 Sanjak
 Ağalık
 Kadılık
 Salname

Titles and posts

 Sultan
 Grand vizier
 Vizier
 Beylerbey
 Pasha
 Kazasker
 Nisanci
 Defterdar
 Reisülküttap
 Lala
 Aga
 Sanjak bey

History of Ottoman-ruled countries

 Albania
 Algeria
 Armenia
 Bosnia and Herzegovina
 Bulgaria
 Cyprus
 Egypt
 Eritrea
 Greece
 Hungary
 Slovakia
 Iraq
 Israel
 Jordan
 Kosovo
 Libya
 Macedonia
 Montenegro
 Palestine (Including Israel (q.v.))
 Serbia
 Syria
 Sudan
 Tunisia
 Turkey
 Ukraine
russia

Ottoman Dynasty

The sultans

|
 Osman I
 Orhan (Gazi)
 Murad I (Hüdavendigar)
 Beyazid I (Yıldırım)
 Mehmed I (Çelebi)
 Murad II 
 Mehmed II (Fatih)
 Bayezid II (Veli)
 Selim I (Yavuz)
 Suleiman I (Kanuni)
 Selim II (Sarı)
 Murad III
 Mehmed III
 Ahmed I
 Mustafa I
 Osman II (Genç)
 Murad IV
 İbrahim (Deli)
|
 Mehmed IV (Avcı)
 Suleiman II
 Ahmed II
 Mustafa II
 Ahmed III
 Mahmud I
 Osman III
 Mustafa III
 Abdulhamid I
 Selim III
 Mustafa IV
 Mahmud II
 Abdülmecid
 Abdulaziz
 Murad V
 Abdulhamid II
 Mehmed V
 Mehmed VI

Some male members of the Ottoman house

 Alaeddin Pasha
 Süleyman Pasha
 Şehzade Halil
 Savcı Bey
 Süleyman Çelebi
 İsa Çelebi
 Musa Çelebi
 Mustafa Çelebi
 Küçük Mustafa
 Cem Sultan
 Şehzade Ahmet
 Şehzade Korkut
 Şehzade Mustafa
 Şehzade Bayezid
 Yusuf Izzettin Efendi
 Abdülmecid II

Mothers and other women assumed the title Valide Sultan

 Malhun Hatun
 Nilüfer Hatun
 Gülçiçek Hatun
 Devlet Hatun
 Emine Hatun
 Hüma Hatun
 Gülbahar Hatun
 Sittişah Hatun
 Gülbahar Hatun
 Hafsa Sultan
 Hürrem Sultan
 Nurbanu Sultan
 Safiye Sultan
 Handan Sultan
 Halime Sultan
 Mahfiruz Hatun
 Kösem Sultan
 Turhan Sultan
 Aşub Sultan
 Muazzez Sultan
 Gülnuş Sultan
 Saliha Sultan
 Şehsuvar Sultan
 Mihrişah Kadın
 Şermi Kadın
 Mihrişah Sultan
 Sineperver Sultan
 Nakşidil Sultan
 Bezmiâlem Sultan
 Pertevniyal Sultan
 Şevkefza Sultan
 Tirimüjgan Kadın
 Gülcemal Kadın
 Perestu Kadın
 Gülüstü Hanım

Some female members of the Ottoman house

 Hatice Sultan (daughter of Selim I) 
 Mahidevran Sultan
 Mihrimah Sultan (daughter of Suleiman I)
 Kaya Sultan
 Hatice Sultan (daughter of Ahmed III)
 Hatice Sultan (daughter of Mustafa III)
 Esma Sultan (daughter of Abdul Hamid I)
 Adile Sultan
 Naile Sultan (daughter of Abdulmejid I)
 Esma Sultan (daughter of Abdülaziz)
 Fehime Sultan

Notable people

Some Crimean Khans

 Meñli I Giray
 Mehmed I Giray
 Sahib I Giray
 Devlet I Giray
 Mehmed IV Giray
 Islam III Giray
 Adil Giray
 Selim I Giray
 Devlet II Giray
 Şahin Giray

Some Grandviziers

|
 Alaeddin Pasha
 Çandarlı Kara Halil Hayreddin Pasha
 Çandarlı (2nd) Halil Pasha
 Mahmut Pasha
 Gedik Ahmet Pasha
 Hersekli Ahmet Pasha
 Karamanlı Mehmet Pasha
 Hadım Sinan Pasha
 Pargalı İbrahim Pasha
 Lütfi Pasha
 Rüstem Pasha
 Sokollu Mehmet Pasha
 Şemsi Pasha
 Lala Kara Mustafa Pasha
 Koca Sinan Pasha
 Damat İbrahim Pasha
 Özdemiroğlu Osman Pasha
 Cigalazade Yusuf Sinan Pasha
 Kuyucu Murat Pasha
 Öküz Kara Mehmet Pasha
 Hadım Mehmet Pasha
 Damat Halil Pasha
 Gazi Hüsrev Pasha
 Bayram Pasha
 Tayyar Mehmet Pasha
 Kemankeş Mustafa Pasha
 Sultanzade Mehmet Pasha
 Nevesinli Salih Pasha
 Kara Musa Pasha
 Hezarpare Ahmet Pasha
 Sofu Mehmet Pasha
 Kara Dev Murat Pasha
 Melek Ahmet Pasha
 Abaza Siyavuş Pasha I
 Tarhoncu Ahmed Pasha
 Kara Dev Murat Pasha
 Gazi Hüseyin Pasha
|
 Köprülü Mehmet Pasha
 Köprülü Fazıl Ahmet Pasha
 Merzifonlu Kara Mustafa Pasha
 Abaza Siyavuş Pasha
 Ayaşlı İsmail Pasha
 Köprülü Fazıl Mustafa Pasha
 Arabacı Ali Pasha
 Çalık Ali Pasha
 Elmas Mehmet Pasha
 Amcazade Köprülü Hüseyin Pasha
 Rami Mehmet Pasha
 Baltacı Mehmet Pasha
 Çorlulu Ali Pasha
 Köprülü Numan Pasha
 Silahtar Ali Pasha
 Damad Ibrahim Pasha
 Hekimoğlu Ali Pasha
 Ivaz Mehmed Pasha
 Nişancı Ahmet Pasha
 Yirmisekizzade Mehmet Sait Pasha
 Koca Ragıp Pasha
 Cezayirli Gazi Hasan Pasha
 Alemdar Mustafa Pasha
 Koca Hüsrev Mehmed Pasha
 Mehmed Emin Rauf Pasha
 Mustafa Reshid Pasha
 Mehmed Emin Âli Pasha
 Mehmed Fuad Pasha
 Midhat Pasha
 Ahmed Vefik Pasha
 Halil Rifat Pasha
 Ahmed Tevfik Pasha
 Mahmud Shevket Pasha
 Said Halim Pasha
 Talaat Pasha
 Ahmed Izzet Pasha
 Damad Ferid Pasha

Other notable viziers, governors and soldiers

 Black Musa
 Abaza Hasan Pasha
 Abaza Mehmed Pasha
 Gazi Evrenos
 Hacı İlbey
 Lala Şahin Pasha
 Zağanos Pasha
 Tiryaki Hasan Pasha
 Telli Hasan Pasha
 Özdemir Pasha
 Cezzar Ahmet Pasha
 Ali Pasha
 Muhammed Ali of Egypt
 Gazi Osman Pasha
 Ethem Pasha
 Ahmet Cemal
 Enver Pasha
 Ingiliz Mustafa

Sea men (Kaptan Pashas)

 Kemal Reis
 Piri Reis
 Oruç Reis
 Barbaros Hayrettin Pasha
 Aydın Reis
 Turgut Reis
 Kurtoğlu Muslihiddin Reis
 Salih Reis
 Murat Reis the Elder
 Seydi Ali Reis
 Piyale Pasha
 Kurtoğlu Hızır Reis
 Müezzinzade Ali Pasha
 Kılıç Ali Pasha
 Mezzo Morto Hüseyin Pasha
 Hasan Rami Pasha

Architects

 Atik Sinan
 Mimar Sinan
 Sedefkar Mehmed Agha
 Mimar Kasım

Artists (painter and calligrapher)

 Ahmed Karahisari
 Nakkaş Osman
 Hâfiz Osman
 Levni
 Osman Hamdi Bey
 Şeker Ahmet Paşa
 Hoca Ali Riza
 Halil Paşa

Musicians

 Hafız Post
 Buhurizade Itri
 Hampartsoum Limondjian
 Dede Efendi
 Tanburi Büyük Osman Bey
 Hacı Arif Bey
 Tatyos Efendi
 Tamburi Cemil Bey

Poets and authors

 Pir Sultan Abdal
 Fuzûlî
 Hayâlî
 Bâkî
 İncili Çavuş
 Nef'i
 Karacaoğlan
 Neşâtî
 Nedîm
 Dadaloğlu
 İbrahim Şinasi
 Agah Efendi
 Namık Kemal
 Tevfik Fikret
 Ömer Seyfettin

Men of letters and historians

 Aşıkpaşazade
 İdris-i Bitlisi
 Matrakçı Nasuh
 Hoca Sadeddin Efendi
 Mustafa Âlî
 Mustafa Selaniki
 Koçi Bey
 Katip Çelebi
 Evliya Çelebi
 İbrahim Peçevi
 Mustafa Naima
 Osman Aga of Timișoara
 İbrahim Müteferrika
 Silahdar Findiklili Mehmed Aga
 Yirmisekiz Mehmed Çelebi
 Ahmed Resmî Efendi
 Ahmet Cevdet Pasha
 Ziya Gökalp

Scientists (including Astrologist)

 Şerafeddin Sabuncuoğlu
 Ali Kuşçu
 Orban
 Takiyuddin
 Hezârfen Ahmet Çelebi
 Lagari Hasan Çelebi
 Erzurumlu İbrahim Hakkı
 Müneccimbaşı Ahmed Dede

Some families

 Balyan family
 Çandarlı Family
 Köprülü family
 Levidis family
 Malkoçoğlu Family

Buildings

Palaces (İstanbul)

 Adile Sultan Palace
 Aynalıkavak Palace
 Beylerbeyi Palace
 Çırağan Palace
 Dolmabahçe Palace
 Esma Sultan Mansion
 Hatice Sultan Palace
 Ihlamur Palace
 Khedive Palace
 Küçüksu Palace
 Maslak Palace
 Topkapı Palace
 Yıldız Palace

Mosques (İstanbul)

 Atik Ali Pasha Mosque
 Atik Valide Mosque
 Beyazıt II Mosque
 Dolmabahçe Mosque
 Eyüp Sultan Mosque
 Fatih Mosque
 Firuz Ağa Mosque
 Handan Agha Mosque
 Kılıç Ali Pasha Mosque
 Laleli Mosque
 Mihrimah Mosque
 Mihrimah Sultan Mosque (Üsküdar)
 Molla Çelebi Mosque
 The New Mosque
 Nuruosmaniye Mosque
 Nusretiye Mosque
 Ortaköy Mosque
 Pertevniyal Mosque
 Rüstem Pasha Mosque
 Sinan Pasha Mosque
 Sokollu Mehmet Pasha Mosque
 Sultan Ahmet Mosque (Blue Mosque)
 Süleymaniye Mosque
 Şehzade Mosque
 Şemsi Pasha Mosque
 Teşvikiye Mosque
 Yavuz Selim Mosque
 Yeni Valide Mosque
 Yıldız Hamidiye Mosque
 Zeynep Sultan Mosque

Mosques (Elsewhere) 

 Bayezid I Mosque 
 Bursa Grand Mosque
 İzzet Mehmet Pasha Mosque
 Murat Paşa Mosque 
 Nasrullah Mosque  
 Old Mosque 
 Omer Pasha Mosque 
 Selimiye Mosque
 Tekeli Mehmet Paşa Mosque 
 Üç Şerefeli Mosque 
 Ulucami 
 Yeşil Mosque

Military

Wars

Ottoman wars in Europe
Ottoman wars in Asia
Ottoman wars in Africa

Croatian–Ottoman Wars 

Long campaign (1443–1444)
Hundred Years' Croatian–Ottoman War (c. 1493 – 1593)
Long War (1593–1606)
Great Turkish War (1662–1699)

Ottoman Persian Wars

 War of 1532–1555
 War of 1578–1590
War of 1603–1618
 War of 1623–1639
 War of 1730–1735
War of 1743–1746 
 War of 1775–1776 
 War of 1821–1823

Ottoman–Venetian Wars 

 Siege of Thessalonica (1422–1430)
 The first Ottoman–Venetian War (1463–1479)
 The second Ottoman–Venetian War (1499–1503)
 The third Ottoman–Venetian War (1537–1540)
 The fourth Ottoman–Venetian War (1570–1573)
 The fifth Ottoman–Venetian War or Cretan War (1645–1669)
 The sixth Ottoman–Venetian War or Morean War (1684–1699)
 The seventh and last Ottoman–Venetian War (1714–1718)

Polish–Ottoman Wars 

Moldavian Magnate Wars
Polish–Ottoman War (1620–1621)
Polish–Ottoman War (1633–1634)
Polish–Cossack–Tatar War (1666–1671)
Polish–Ottoman War (1672–1676) (or "2nd Polish–Ottoman War")
Polish–Ottoman War (1683–1699) (or "3rd Polish–Ottoman War")

Russo-Turkish War 

Russo-Turkish War (1568–1570)
Russo-Turkish War (1676–1681)
Russo-Turkish War (1686–1700)
Russo Turkish War (1710)
Russo-Turkish War (1735-1739)
Russo-Turkish War (1768–1774)
Russo-Turkish War (1787–1792)
Russo-Turkish War (1806–1812)
Russo-Turkish War (1828–1829)
Russo-Turkish War (1877–1878)

Other wars 

 Byzantine–Ottoman Wars
 Ottoman–Persian Wars
 History of the Serbian–Turkish wars
 Ottoman–Habsburg wars
 Indian Ocean campaigns
 Italian War of 1542–1546
 Italo-Turkish War
 Balkan Wars
 World War I

Sieges

 Bursa (1326)
 İznik (1331)
 İzmit (1333)
 Edirne (1361)
 Tarnovo (1393)
 İstanbul (1422)
 Thessalonica (1422)
 Svetigrad (1448)
 İstanbul (1453)
 Belgrade (1456)
 Kruje (1478)
 Rhodes (1480)
 Otranto (1481)
 Cairo (1517)
 Rhodes (1522)
 Algiers (1529)
 Vienna (1529)
 Tunis (1534)
 Baghdat (1534)
 Corfu (1537)
 Diu (1538)
 Aden (1538)
 Castelnuovo (1539)
 Buda (1541)
 Esztergom (1543)
 Van (1547)
 Tripoli (1551)
 Eger(1552)
 Oran (1556)
 Oran (1563)
 Malta (1565)
 Szigetvar (1566)
 Tunis (1574)
 Baghdad (1638)
 Candia (1669)
 Vienna (1683)
 Belgrade (1739)

Battles (before World War 1)

|
 Bapheus
 Dimbos
 Pelekanon
 Ihtiman
 Maritsa
 Dubrovnica
 Savra
 Bileca
 1.Kosova
 Rovine
 Nicopolis
 Ankara
 Varna
 2.Kosova
 Albulena (Ujëbardha)
 Otlukbeli
 Vasliu
 Valea Alba
 Ekmek Otlak (Câmpul Pâinii)
 Krbava
 Zonchio
 Modon
 Chaldiran
 Marj Dabiq
 Yaunis Khan
 Ridanieh
 Mohács
 Formentera
 Preveza
 Algiers
 Sohoista
 Ponza
 Djerbe
 Lepanto
 Çıldır
 Torches
 Sisak
 Keresztes
 Cecora
 Khotyn (1621)
 Focchies
 Dardanelles (1654)
 Dardanelles (1655)
 Dardanelles (1656)
 Dardanelles (1657)
 Saint Gotthard
 Khotyn (1673)
 Vienna
 2.Mohács
 Slankamen
 Oinousses Islands (Koyun Adaları)
 Andros
 Zenta
 Pruth River
 Petrovaradin
 Imbros
 Matapan
|
 Hisarcık (Grocka)
 Stavuchany
 Chesma
 Larga
 Kagul
 Fokşan
 Rymnik
 Kaliakra (1791)
 Pyramids
 Abukir
 Arpachai
 Athos
 Al Safra
 Jeddah
 Čegar
 Alamana
 Dragashani
 Dervenakia
 Kamatero
 Navarino
 Kulevicha
 Algiers
 3.Kosova
 Konya
 Nezib
 Oltenitza
 Sinop
 Kurekdere
 Eupatoria
 Kızıl Tepe
 Plevna
 Shipka
 Tashkessen
 Dömeke
 Tobruk
 Beirut
 Kardzhali
 Sarantaporo
 Giannitsa
 Kumanovo
 Kirk Kilisse
 Pente Pigadia
 Prilep
 Lule Burgas
 Merhamli
 Sorovich
 Monastir
 Kaliakra (1912)
 Imroz (Elli)
 Bulair
 Şarköy
 Adrianople
 Lemnos (Limni)
 Bizani
 Scutari
 Yenidje

Battles of the First World War

Caucasus Campaign 

 Köprüköy (Bergmann)
 Sarikamis
 Ardahan
 Malazgirt (Manzikert)
 Kara Kilise
 Erzurum
 Trabzon
 Bitlis
 Erzincan
 Sardarapat
 Abaran
 Karakilisa
 Baku

Mesopotamian campaign 

 Fao– Basra
 Qurna
 Es Sinn
 Ctesiphon
 1st Kut
 Shiekh Sa'ad
 Wadi
 Hanna
 Dujaila
 2nd Kut
 Baghdad
 Samarra offensive
 Ramadi
 Khan Baghdadi
 Sharqat

Sinai and Palestine Campaign 

 Kanal (Suez)
 Romani
 Magdhaba
 Refah (Rafa)
 1st Gaza
 2nd Gaza
 El Buggar
 Birüşebi (Beersheba)
 3rd Gaza
 Mughar Ridge
 Kudüs(Jerusalem)
 Abu Tellul
 Megiddo

Gallipoli Campaign 

 Çanakkale deniz (Naval operations)
 Arıburnu (Anzac Cove)
 Helles
 1.Kirte (Krithia)
 2.Kirte (Krithia)
 3.Kirte (Krithia)
 Kumkale
 Sığındere (Gully Ravine)
 Anafartalar (Sari Bair)
 Kirte Bağları (Krithia Vineyard)
 Kanlısırt (Lone Pine)
 Suvla
 Kılışbayır (The Nek)
 Conk Bayırı (Chunuk Bair)
 Yusufçuk Tepe (Scimitar Hill)
 Hill 60

Treaties

|
 Ottoman–Venetian
 Edirne-Segedin (Szeged)
 Constantinople (1479)
 Constantinople (1533)
 Franco-Turkish
 Adrianople (1547)
 Amasya
 Adrianople (1568)
 Istanbul (1590)
 Zitvatorok
 Nasuh Pasha
 Serav
 Khotyn
 Kasr'ı Şirin (Zuhab)
 Vasvar
 Buczacs
 İzvença (Zurawno)
 Bakhchisarai
 Karlowitz
 Constantinople (1700)
 Pruth
 Passarowitz
 İstanbul (1724)
 Ahmet Pasha
 İstanbul (1736)
 Belgrade
 Niš
 Kerden
 Kuçük Kaynarca
 Aynalıkavak
 Sistova
 Jassy
|
 Algeria
 Tripoli
 Tunis
 Paris
 Kale’i Sültani (Dardanelles)
 Bucharest
 Erzurum
 Akkerman
 Adrianople
 İstanbul (1832)
 Hünkâr İskelesi
 Kütahya
 Balta limanı
 London (1840)
 London (1841)
 Paris (1856)
 Scutari
 Ayastefanos (Yeşilköy)
 Berlin (1878)
 Cyprus
 Tophane
 İstanbul (1897)
 Ouchy
 London (1913)
 İstanbul (1913)
 Athens
 Erzincan
 Brest Litovsk
 Batum
 Mudros
 Sèvres

Revolts and notable events

 Sheikh Bedrettin
 Şahkulu
 Jelali revolts
 Beylerbeyi Event
 Abaza rebellion
 Atmeydanı Incident
 Çınar Incident
 Edirne event
 Patrona Halil
 Kabakçı Mustafa
 Charter of Alliance
 The Auspicious Incident
 Serbian revolt
 Greek revolt
 Bulgarian revolt
 Arab revolt
 Atçalı Kel Mehmet
 31 March Incident
 Babıali raid

Diplomacy

 French Ambassador to the Ottoman Empire
 Polish Jagiellon ambassadors to the Ottoman Empire

Lists

 List of the Ottoman battles in which the sultan participated
 Campaigns of Suleiman the Magnificent
 List of campaigns of Mehmed the Conqueror
 Ports of the Ottoman Empire
 Outline and timeline of the Greek genocide

See also

 Wikilala

Notes

External links 

 Ottoman Text Archive Project – University of Washington
 Ottoman Empire in The Oxford Dictionary of Islam
 The Ottoman Empire: Resources – University of Michigan
 The Ottoman Empire: A Chronological Outline
 World Civilizations: The Ottomans A comprehensive site that covers much about the Ottoman state and government
 Ottoman History Podcast An internet radio broadcast dedicated to the history, culture and society of the Ottoman Empire and Middle East
 Turkish Oral Narrative
 The Online Bibliography of Ottoman-Turkish Literature A bi-lingual site (English version) presenting a user-submissable database of references to theses, books, articles, papers and research-projects
Osmanlı Edebiyatı Çalışmaları Bibliyografyası Veritabanı Turkish version of The Online Bibliography of Ottoman-Turkish Literature
 Information about Ottomans
   – covers the period 1300–1600
 The Sakıp Sabancı Collection of Ottoman Calligraphy 
 Ottomans History Blog
 Turkey in the First World War
 Ottoman Navy and Navigation
 Engravings of Ottoman Empire – HQ image gallery 
 Ottoman Studies Resources in Internet

Topics
Ottoman Empire
Ottoman Empire
Outlines of history and events